The 6th Infantry Division (Hangul: 제6보병사단, Hanja: 第六步兵師團) is a military formation of the Republic of Korea Army.

Structure
Headquarters:
Headquarters Company
DMZ Patrol Company
Air Defense Company
Anti-Tank Company
Armor Battalion
Signal Battalion
Reconnaissance Battalion
Engineer Battalion
Support Battalion
Military Police Battalion
Medical Battalion
Chemical Battalion
2 Infantry Regiment
7th Infantry Regiment
19 Infantry Regiment
Artillery Regiment

History
The Division initially consisted of the 2nd, 7th, and 19th Regiments.

Korean War
The 2nd Infantry Regiment was originally activated as the 2nd Regiment on February 28, 1946, at Taejon and was first commanded by Lt. Col. Lee Hyong Kun. The unit was initially assigned to the 1st Brigade in December 1947 and was later reassigned to the 6th Division when it was activated in May 1949. On June 25, 1950, the 6th Division took part in the Battle of Chuncheon during the North Korean attack. 

The division became part of II Corps after the first fall of Seoul.
It was part of the defensive line to slow the North Korean advance from Seoul to Taejon.

Fought in the Battle of Pusan Perimeter.

The 6th Division, meeting little opposition and traveling fast up the Chongchon River valley, reached Huichon, nearly sixteen miles north of Kujang-dong, on the night of October 23, 1950. Passing through Onjong, twenty-six miles from Huich'on, during the night of the twenty-fourth, the 7th Regiment, 6th Division, turned north and advanced toward Chosan, fifty miles away on the Yalu River. A reinforced reconnaissance platoon from the 7th Regiment entered Chosan the next morning and found the North Koreans retreating across the Yalu into China over a narrow floating footbridge.

On October 25, in the ROK II Corps sector, the 3d Battalion, 2d Regiment, 6th Division, started northwest from Onjong, about fifty miles from Yalu River, toward Pukchin. Eight miles west of Onjong the 3d Battalion encountered what was thought to be a small force of North Koreans but was, in reality, a Communist Chinese forces (CCF) trap, in which CCF troops destroyed the 3d Battalion as an organized force. On the evening of the next day the division ordered its 7th Regiment to withdraw south. Before it could do so, however, it needed supplies, which were airdropped on the twenty-eighth. As the 7th Regiment headed south the following morning, it ran into an enemy roadblock about twenty miles south of Kojang.

On 26 November 1950, a column of retreating South Korean soldiers of the ROKA 6th and 7th Divisions from Tokchon was attacked by a battalion of the Turkish Brigade  who were the first to arrive at Wawon, after the Turks mistook the South Koreans for Chinese. 125 South Koreans were taken prisoner and many of them were slaughtered by the Turks. The event was wrongly reported in U.S. and European media as a Turkish victory over the Chinese and even after news leaked out about the truth to the Americans, no efforts were made by the media to retract the story.

After the Chinese intervention and attacks in November 1950, the U.S. 2nd Infantry Division, the Turkish Brigade, and the ROK 6th, 7th, and 8th Infantry Divisions were shattered units that would need extensive rest and refitting to recover combat effectiveness.

See also
Korean Demilitarized Zone

References

Sources

External links

InfDiv0006
InfDiv0006SK
Military units and formations established in 1948